is an opera, or dramma per musica, by Giuseppe Sarti, set to a libretto by the renowned poet Metastasio. The opera was first performed in the winter of 1762 in Copenhagen, and was composed especially for the Danish court of the time. The opera consists of three acts, and the libretto is based upon the well-known story of Dido and Aeneas.

Metastasio's libretto had already been extensively used throughout the century. The most notable of previous adaptations was by Leonardo Vinci.

Roles

References
John A. Rice, "Didone abbandonata", Grove Music Online, ed L. Macy (accessed 2 June 2007), grovemusic.com , subscription access.

Italian-language operas
Operas by Giuseppe Sarti
1762 operas
Operas
Operas based on classical mythology
Operas based on the Aeneid
Music based on poems
Cultural depictions of Dido